Siege of Salerno may refer to:

Siege of Salerno (871–872), by the Aghlabids
Siege of Salerno (1076), by Robert Guiscard
Siege of Salerno (1137), by the Republic of Pisa
Siege of Salerno (1194), by Henry VI, Holy Roman Emperor